The Kachin peoples (Jingpo: Ga Hkyeng, ;), more precisely the Kachin Wunpong (Jingpo: Jinghpaw Wunpawng, "The Kachin Confederation") or simply Wunpong ("The Confederation"), are a confederation of ethnic groups who inhabit the Kachin Hills in Northern Myanmar's Kachin State and neighbouring Yunnan Province, China, as well as Arunachal Pradesh, Assam in Northeastern India. About one million Kachin peoples live in the region. The term Kachin people is often used interchangeably with the main subset, called the Jingpo people in China.

The Jingpho language common to many of the Kachin has a variety of dialects and is written with a Latin-based script created in the late nineteenth century. A Burmese script version was subsequently developed. The Singhpo dialect is spoken in Northeast India and Jingpho in southwest China.

Kachin is an ethnicity that comprises various linguistic groups with overlapping territories and integrated social structures. Contemporary usage of Kachin relates to a grouping of six ethnicities: Rawang, the Lisu, the Jingpo, the Zaiwa, the Lashi/Lachik and the Lawngwaw/Maru. Some definitions distinguish Kachin and Shan (Tai) peoples though some Kachin people have demonstrated the over-simplicity of the concept of lineage-based ethnic identity by culturally "becoming Shans".

Etymology

There are many theories of how Kachin people got their name. One of them comes from American baptist missionary Dr. Eugenio Kincaid. When he arrived to the northern part of Myanmar, he first met with the Gahkyeng people. When he asked them who they were, they replied that they were the villagers from Gahkyeng. Therefore, he wrote "Ga hkyeng" in his notes. European writers called the Kachins "Kakhyens" until 1899. The book "The Great Queen is Coming 1890" described Major Ecy Brong was the first person who started using "Kachin" in Roman script. It is also possible that the name comes from the Harari (Harla) word "qachin", which means thin, lean, slender, or narrow.

Categorisation
In Yunnan, a different categorization is applied and peoples grouped as Wunpong are grouped into four nations. The Chinese definition of Jingpo (which include all speakers of Zaiwa cluster of Northern Burmese languages) is broader than that in Kachin Hills and is somewhat comparable to Wunpong in Kachin Hills. Lisu, Anung (Rawang) and Derung (Taron) peoples in Yunnan are not subordinated to ethnic Jingpo thus are classified outside the Jingpo nation: 
 Jingpo nation (Jingpo: Jinghpaw Pawngyawng)
 Ethnic Zaiwa
 Ethnic Jingpo proper
 Subethnic Jinghpo proper
 Subethnic Gauri
 Subethnic N'hkum
 Subethnic Shatam
 Subethnic Mungchi
 Other subethnicities
 Ethnic Lisu
 Ethnic Lachik
 Bola-speakers
 Lisu nation
 Nu nation
 Ethnic Nusu
 Ethnic Zauzou
 Ethnic Anung of Anung-speaking
 Ethnic Anung of Derung-speaking
 Derung nation

History

British colonial rule and Burmese independence 
British rule in Burma began in 1824 after the first Anglo-Burmese War. Due to the remote location of the Kachin State and its rugged landscape, however, Kachin Peoples were relatively untouched by British rule. American missionaries were the first to heavily interact with Kachin Peoples and they converted large tracts of the population from animism to Christianity. During the late 1800s and early 1900s, the British started replacing ethnic Burmans in the military with Chin, Kachin, and Karen soldiers. This exclusion of ethnic Burmans from the British military was formally adopted in 1925 when policy was written only allowing ethnic minorities to enlist in the army. Due to this change in military composition, many ethnic Burmans began associating the ethnic minorities with British oppression. Following the Japanese invasion of Burma in 1942, many Burmese soldiers rallied together to form the Burmese Independence Army (BIA) and fight against the British alongside the Japanese. The Kachin Peoples, however, were recruited by the British and America to fight against Japanese forces with the promise of autonomy after the war. After the end of World War II and British rule in the region, the Kachin Peoples agreed to join the Union of Burma at the 1947 Panglong Conference. The conference brought together Kachin, Chin, and Shan leaders - along with the Burman leader at the time General Aung San. Together they signed the Panglong Agreement which granted the ethnic border states autonomy in local administration and equal treatment by the State. The assassination of General Aung San, however, reduced government support for the agreement and led to feelings of betrayals on the part of Kachin Peoples.

Kachin independence movement 
The Kachin Independence Organization (KIO) was formed on October 25, 1960, to advocate for and protect the rights of Kachin Peoples. A year after its inception, the Kachin Independence Army (KIA) was created to be the armed wing of the KIO. While the KIA initially started with a hundred members, current reports from KIA commanders indicate an army 10,000 strong with another 10,000 in reserves. Both the KIO and KIA support their missions with the trade of jade, timber, and other raw materials with China.

1994 ceasefire agreement 
After 33 years of insurgency, the KIO signed a ceasefire agreement with the State Law and Order Restoration Council (SLORC), ending all military missions instigated by both the Tatmadaw (Myanmar Army) and the KIO. The ceasefire primarily ended military activity but also included stipulations that the Myanmar government fund development projects in the Kachin state. At the time of signing, the KIO was facing increased military pressure from the Tatmadaw and decreasing support from foreign actors to continue warfare against the State.

Border Guard Forces 
Prior to the 2010 elections, the Tatmadaw implored government officials to turn the KIA, along with other ethnic insurgent groups, into militia forces under the jurisdiction of the Tatmadaw. The order stemmed from a military-drafted 2008 Constitution mandating all armed forces surrender their weapons, fall under the central authority of the Tatmadaw, and rebrand as Border Guard Forces (BGF). The KIO refused to transform into a BGF and instead provided a counter-proposal which would rebrand the KIA as the Kachin Regional Guard Force (KRGF). The new organization would work towards ethnic equality for Kachin Peoples but the effort was dismissed by the Tatmadaw.

Land rights dispute 
Following the 1994 ceasefire, the State Law and Order Restoration Council (SLORC) and State Peace and Development Council (SPDC) engaged in land-grabs across the Kachin State. Leveraging weak land governance policies, SLORC and SPDC invited foreign actors to invest in mining, logging, dam construction, and other infrastructure projects in lands traditionally owned by Kachin People. Furthermore, the Kachin State is rich in natural resources, particularly jade, which the Tatmadaw (Myanmar Army) and KIO fight for control over. Throughout the late 1900s and early 2000s, the Tatmadaw established military presence in areas designated for commercial development, eroding the control of land under the governance of the KIO.

2011–2013 conflict in Kachin State 
Following the 2011 election of Thein Sein as President of Myanmar additional ceasefires were signed with many of the largest ethnic armed organizations (EAOs) signaling reconciliation. However, on June 9, 2011, Tatmadaw forces broke the 17-year ceasefire and launched an armed offensive against the KIO along the Taping River near a hydroelectric plant. During the attack, Tatmadaw forces abducted KIO Lance Corporal Chang Ying only to return his tortured body days later. The move prompted retaliation from KIO and began a series of deadly skirmishes between the two. By 2012 fighting between KIA and Tatmadaw forces escalated to all regions of the Kachin state. After multiple rounds of discussion, President Thein Sein declared a temporary ceasefire in May 2013 against the desires of Tatmadaw commanders on the ground. By the end of the two year conflict, an estimated 100,000 Kachin people were displaced.

Culture and traditions

The Kachin people are traditionally known for their disciplined fighting skills, complex clan inter-relations, craftsmanship, herbal healing and jungle survival skills. In recent decades, animist and Buddhist beliefs have been left, and are now embracing Christianity in different areas. According to a source, approximately two-thirds of the Kachin people identify themselves as Christians, while another places the figure at 90 to 95 per cent. Many religious rituals and symbols, such as the annual Manau festival in Myitkyina, are celebrated as folkloric traditions.

Human rights 
The Kachin Peoples have suffered numerous human rights violations and transgressions against the community, especially by the Tatmadaw continue to be documented. Violations by the Tatmadaw include rape and sexual assault, extrajudicial killings, forced labor, torture, physical abuse, and many other forms of discrimination or outright violence. In 2014 alone, over 100 rapes in the Kachin State were recorded by the Women's League of Burma. In another incident, a Kachin civilian was tortured and subsequently forced to guide Tatmadaw soldiers through combat areas in the Mansi Township.

The conflict between the KIA and Tatmadaw has led to a large-scale refugee crisis with over 100,000 Kachin people displaced. These internally displaced people (IDPs) often attempt to cross the border into neighboring China. In 2011, however, Kachin IDPs were forcibly sent back to Myanmar and denied refugee status by the Chinese government. This lack of recognition as refugees or asylum seekers has forced many Kachin peoples to form large IDP camps in Myanmar. Only IDP camps in Tatmadaw controlled areas, however, are provided access to UN convoys and international aid. International actors attempting to provide aid in KIA controlled areas are often denied access by the Myanmar government on the basis of security.

See also

 Kachin Cuisine
 Kachin Independence Organisation
 Jingpo people

References

Further reading